Hispanic and Latino Marylanders are residents of the state of Maryland who are of Hispanic or Latino ancestry. As of the year 2019, Hispanics and Latinos of any race were 10.4% of the state's population.  The largest concentration of Hispanics/Latinos is in the National Capital Area, where Hispanics and Latinos constitute 16.04% of the total population (17.02% of Montgomery County and 14.94% of Prince George's County). Some Maryland communities such as Langley Park, Riverdale Park, East Riverdale, Templeville, and Marydel have Hispanic and Latino-majority populations. Other communities such as Wheaton, Glenmont, and Aspen Hill have a Hispanic/Latino plurality population.

History 
In the early 18th century, a Sephardi Spanish and Portuguese Jewish community was established in Maryland. This small community of Sephardim was centered in Baltimore.

Baltimore

Politics
As of 2016, 35.8% of Maryland's Hispanic and Latino population was eligible to vote. By contrast, 80% of non-Hispanic white Marylanders are eligible to vote. Maryland had 199,000 Hispanic/Latino eligible voters, ranking 20th in the United States by state. 5% of all eligible voters in Maryland are Hispanic/Latino.

Hispanic or Latino by national origin

See also

Hispanics and Latinos in Washington, D.C.

References

External links

Hispanics in Maryland: Health Data and Resources